Bondivatn Station is a railway station in Asker, Norway on the Spikkestad Line. It was opened as part of the Drammen Line on 7 July 1952. In 1973 the Lieråsen Tunnel opened through Lieråsen, and the old part of the Drammen Line was transformed to a commuter train line.

The station is served by commuter trains to Oslo Central Station and onward to Lillestrøm Station. Bondivatn is primarily a residential area.

Railway stations in Asker
Railway stations on the Spikkestad Line
Railway stations opened in 1952
1952 establishments in Norway